This is a list of gaps in Virginia.

By mountain range
This list is arranged by mountain ranges.

Appalachian Mountains
Hoop Petticoat Gap, elevation 860 feet, on U.S. Route 50 in Virginia to Romney
Paddy Gap in Paddy Mountain, elevation 1,400 feet, 
Brocks Gap in Little North Mountain, elevation 1,020 feet, on Virginia State Route 259 to North Mountain
Dry River Gap on U.S. Route 33 in Virginia to Harrisonburg-Franklin
Buffalo Gap on Virginia State Route 42 to Clifton Forge
Goshen Pass on the  Maury River
Allison Gap, Virginia on Poor Valley Road 613, Smyth County
East Stone Gap, Virginia on Orby Cantrell Highway or U.S. Route 58 Alternate
Big Stone Gap, Virginia
Olinger Gap north of Low Gap near Old Still Hollow
Low Gap east of Scott Gap
Scott Gap east of Dalton Gap
Dalton Gap north of Pennington Gap
Pennington Gap on U.S. Route 421 near Pennington Gap, Virginia
Low Gap near Mullins Ridge south of U.S. Route 58 in Virginia
Hunter Gap on Virginia Route 70
Mulberry Gap or Fitts Gap on Mulberry Gap Road
Jones Gap on Virginia-Tennessee border west of Phoebe Butt
Bow Gap east of Yellow Rock
Cranks Gap west of Yellow Rock
Hubbard Springs Gap on Virginia-Kentucky border near Hubbard Springs, Virginia
Hubbard Gap near Hubbard Springs, Virginia
Harris Gap on Virginia-Kentucky border near Hubbard Springs, Virginia
Brierfield Gap on Virginia-Kentucky border near Hagan, Virginia
Maple's Gap on the Wise County/Scott County border
Middleton Gap north of Falling Waters Gap
Falling Waters Gap on Virginia-Kentucky border north of Rose Hill, Virginia
Cumberland Gap, elevation 1,600 feet, central feature of Cumberland Gap National Historical Park
Chadwell Gap on Virginia-Kentucky border in Cumberland Gap National Historical Park
Butchers Gap on Virginia-Kentucky border in Cumberland Gap National Historical Park
Pound Gap, elevation 2,392 feet, on U.S. Route 23

Blue Ridge Mountains
This list of Virginia Blue Ridge gaps is listed starting from north to south.
Potomac Water Gap, elevation 240 feet, Harpers Ferry, on U.S. Route 340
Keyes Gap, originally Vestal's Gap, elevation 895 feet, on Virginia State Route 9 in Loudoun County
Wilson Gap, also Gregory Gap, elevation 1440 feet, in Loudoun County
Snickers Gap, originally William's Gap in 1769, on Virginia State Route 7 
Ashby's Gap, elevation 1,100 feet, on U.S. Route 50
Manassas Gap, also known as Markham's Gap and Calmese Gap, elevation 950 feet, on U.S. Route 55 and Interstate 66
Chester Gap, also known as Happy Creek Gap, elevation 1,339 feet, on U.S. Route 522
Elkwallow Gap, elevation 2,455 feet on Skyline Drive
Thornton Gap, elevation 2,460 feet, on U.S. Route 211
Hughes River Gap north of Little Stony Man
Fishers Gap, elevation 3,070 feet, on Skyline Drive
Hawksbill Gap, elevation 3,360 feet
Pine Hill Gap east southeast of Hot Mountain
Turkeypen Gap south of Breedlove Knob
Laurel Gap east northeast of Bootens Gap
Bootens Gap between Powell Mountain and Jones Mountain
Swift Run Gap on U.S. Route 33
Smith Roach Gap northeast of Roundtop on Skyline Drive
Powell Gap on Skyline Drive north of Flattop Mountain
Simmons Gap between Weaver Mountain and Flattop Mountain near Simmons Gap, Virginia, Greene County 
Browns Gap
Black Rock Gap
Jarmans Gap near Waynesboro
Rockfish Gap (also known as Afton Gap) on Interstate 64
Reeds Gap on VA 664 (Reeds Gap Road)
Tye River Gap on Virginia State Route 56
Indian/White's Gap on U.S. Route 60
Petites Gap (Elevation 2,369 Feet) 
James River Gorge
Bearwallow Gap on Blue Ridge Parkway
Black Horse Gap on Blue Ridge Parkway
Buford's Gap on U.S. Route 460
Adney Gap on U.S. Route 221
Volunteer Gap at Fancy Gap, Virginia elevation 2,672 feet on Blue Ridge Parkway Mile Post 193
Pipers Gap on Virginia State Route 97
Mikes Gap south of Gleaves Road near Ewing Mountain
Dry Run Gap on Grayson Turnpike or U.S. Route 21 in Virginia
Blue Spring Gap near Comers Rock Road
Flat Ridge Gap south of Blue Spring Gap
Dickey Gap at intersection of Mt. Rogers Scenic Byway Virginia State Route 16 and Comers Creek Road
Massie Gap near Mount Rogers
Rhododendron Gap near Mount Rogers
Deep Gap west of Mount Rogers
Bear Tree Gap on J.E.B Stuart Highway aka U.S. Route 58
McQueen Gap south of Chestnut Mountain on Virginia-Tennessee border

Short Hill Mountain
Hillsboro Gap, Hillsboro on Route 9

Bull Run Mountains
Hopewell Gap on Hopewell Road
Thoroughfare Gap (Bull Run Mountain) on I-66

Catoctin Mountain
Clarks Gap

Massanutten Mountain
Edinburg Gap, Edinburg Gap Road
Taskers Gap, between Mertins Rock and Bowman Mountain
Mooreland Gap, VA Route 730, Shenandoah County
New Market Gap, elevation 1800 feet, on U.S. Route 211
Roaring Run Gap, south of Short Horse Mountain
Fridley Gap, north of Fourth Mountain
Little Gap, north of Hartman Knob
Runkles Gap, north of Hartman Knob
Harshberger Gap, near Massanutten Peak

Southwest Mountains
Turkeysag Gap
Stony Point Pass

References

Mountain passes of Virginia
Gaps